Kohima (Angami Naga: Kewhira is the capital of the Northeastern Indian state of Nagaland. With a resident population of almost 100,000, it is the second largest city in the state. Kohima constitutes both a district and a municipality. The city lies on the foothills of Japfü section of the Barail Range located south of the District and has an average elevation of 1,261 metres (4137 feet).

Originally known as Kewhira, Kohima's history goes back to a time when it was a village of the Angami Nagas. It became an urban centre in 1878 when the British Empire established its headquarters of the then Naga Hills District of Assam Province. It officially became the capital after the state of Nagaland was inaugurated in 1963. Kohima was the site of one of the bloodiest battles of World War II. The battle is often referred to as the Stalingrad of the East. In 2013, the British National Army Museum voted the Battle of Kohima to be Britain's Greatest Battle.

Etymology
Kohima was originally known as Kewhi–ra. It is called after the wild flowering plant ‘Kewhi’, found in the mountains. Most local people prefer to use ‘Kewhi–ra’.

History
Kohima was originally a large village named Kewhira, which is located in the northeastern part of the present day Kohima Urban Area. The village is divided into four large clans (thinuo): Tsütuonuomia, Lhisemia, Dapfhütsumia and Pfüchatsumia (T, L, D, and P Khel respectively).

Colonial era
The East India Company Administration started to expand into Kohima beginning the 1840s. The progress made by the company armies in annexing the region continued after the Indian Rebellion of 1857, although now under the auspices of the British Indian Army. Kohima was the first seat of modern administration as the Headquarters of Naga Hills District (then under Assam Province) with the appointment of Guybon Henry Damant as Political Officer in 1879.

Battle of Kohima

In 1944 during the Second World War the Battle of Kohima along with the simultaneous Battle of Imphal was the turning point in the Burma Campaign. For the first time in South-East Asia, the Japanese lost the initiative to the Allies, which the Allies then retained until the end of the war. This hand-to-hand battle and slaughter prevented the Japanese Army from gaining a base from which they might have easily gone into the plains of India.

Kohima has a large cemetery known as the Kohima War Cemetery for the Allied war dead; it is maintained by the Commonwealth War Graves Commission. The cemetery lies on the slopes of Garrison Hill, in what was once the Deputy Commissioner's tennis court, which was the scene of intense fighting known as the Battle of the Tennis Court. The epitaph carved on the memorial of the 2nd British Division in the cemetery has become world-famous as the Kohima poem.
When You Go Home, Tell Them of Us and Say,

For Your Tomorrow, We Gave Our Today.
The verse is attributed to John Maxwell Edmonds (1875–1958), and is thought to have been inspired by the epitaph written by Simonides to honour the Greek who fell at the Battle of Thermopylae in 480 BC.

1963–present
When Nagaland became a full-fledged state on 1 December 1963, Kohima was named as the state capital.

Killings of Kekuojalie Sachü and Vikhozo Yhoshü

On 20 March 1986, two students Kekuojalie Sachü and Vikhozo Yhoshü were killed in indiscriminate firing by Nagaland Police when they participated in a peaceful protest called by the Naga Students' Federation (NSF) to rally against the state government's decision on the introduction of Indian Police Service (IPS) cadres and the extension of the Disturbed Area Belt from 5 to 20 km along the Indo-Myanmar (Indo-Burma) border. The event was so tumultuous that it led three Cabinet ministers and five State Ministers of Nagaland to resign.

1995 Kohima Massacre

On 5 March 1995, when a convoy of the 16th Rashtriya Rifles of the Indian Army was traversing through Kohima, a tyre burst from one of the convoy's own vehicle led the armed troops to mistake the sound of the tyre bursting for a bomb attack. The troops reacted immediately and started firing at civilian populace. A total of 7 were killed and 36 were left injured. The incident is widely referred to as the 1995 Kohima Massacre.

2017 Nagaland protests

On 2 February 2017, the office building of the Kohima Municipal Council was burned down by a mob as part of the boycott of the Civic Elections. The fire significantly damaged adjoining government and private buildings. On 19 February, in response against the backdrop of widespread protests and civil unrest in the state, T. R. Zeliang announced his resignation as the Chief Minister of Nagaland.

Geography

Topography
Kohima is located at 25°67' North, 94°10' East, in the southern part of Nagaland. It lies north of the Japfü–Barail intersection with Pulie Badze to the southwest overlooking the city.

Climate
The city experiences a subtropical highland climate (Köppen: Cwb), with greater contrast between summer and winter than in other continents due to the monsoons but mild temperatures even for latitude and altitude. The months of June to September concentrate much of the precipitation.

Kohima has pleasant winters with little rainfall and very warm, very rainy summers. The coolest months are from December to February, when frost may occur and in the highest altitudes occasional snowfall is possible.

Environment

Water supply and availability
Most Wards in Kohima experiences severe water shortages during the dry seasons. The current water resources from the reservoirs of Zarü River and the streams from the slopes of Pulie Badze do not fulfill the needs of the rapidly growing population of Kohima. With the augmentation of the Zarü River project and several other upcoming water projects to be supplied from Dzüko Valley and others. The water supply is expected to cover more wards.

Administration
The Kohima Municipal Council (KMC) was established in 2005 under India's Constitution (Seventy-Fourth Amendment) Act, 1992. It has waste management, drainage and trade licensing and other responsibilities.

Other departments of the state government, which sit in Kohima, also have a role in the administration of Kohima. The "City Development Plan" for the town, for example, was written by state Urban Development Department.

Wards 

Each ward has its own council government and handles many of the functions that are handled by city governments in other jurisdictions.

Public safety

Police and law enforcement
The Kohima Police of the Nagaland Police is the police force responsible for maintaining security, law and order in the Kohima Metropolitan Area. It is headed by a Superintendent of Police (SP). Kevithuto Sophie is the current SP of Kohima. The municipal area of Kohima is served by two police stations—Kohima North Police Station and Kohima South Police Station.

In 2020, the Kohima North Police Station became the first police station and a government facility in the entire North Eastern Region of India to receive the International Standard Organization (ISO) 9001 Certification for quality management system.

Demographics

Census data

As of 2011, Kohima had a population of 99,039 of which males and females were 51,626 and 47,413 respectively. Kohima has an average literacy rate of 90.76%, higher than the national average of 79.55%.

The city's population is composed of the 17 Ethnic Groups of Nagaland. The population of the Angamis, Aos and Lothas are the largest in present-day Kohima Urban Area.

Religion

The major religion in Kohima is Christianity which is practised by 80.22% of the population. Other religions includes Hinduism (16.09%), Islam (3.06%) and Buddhism (0.45%).

Economy

Commerce
Kohima has numerous shopping centers ranging from traditional markets to modern shopping malls. There are many dedicated markets for local products such as traditional handlooms and handicrafts.

Some major shopping areas of the city are:
 Bamboo Market
 Khedi Market
 Kohima Trade Centre
 Main Town Area
 Mao Market
 Sokhriezie Market
 Super Market
 Tibetan Market
 T–Khel Market

Tourism
Tourism plays an important role in the city's economy. The number of tourists visiting Kohima has been increasing significantly each year.

Cityscape

Historical sites

Kohima War Cemetery

Kohima War Cemetery is a memorial dedicated to soldiers of the 2nd British Division of the Allied Forces who died in the Second World War at Kohima in April 1944. There are 1,420 Commonwealth burials of the Second World War at this cemetery.

Parks
Sakhrie Park

Sakhrie Park is a recreational park located at Middle Tsiepfü Tsiepfhe Ward (Middle AG) located between the Asian Highway 1 and the Tsiepfü Tsiepfhe Road (AG) .

Sokhriezie Park

Sokhriezie Park is a centrally located lake that sits below the PHQ Junction.

Kohima Botanical Garden

Kohima Botanical Garden is located at New Ministers' Hill Ward and is looked after by the Nagaland Forest Department.

Culture

Cultural centers
The Kohima Capital Cultural Center is a cultural center which has a multipurpose hall that provides various facilities for its citizens.

Events and Festivals

NAJ Cosfest

The NAJ Cosfest is an Otaku-based cosplay festival held every year in the month of July. The annual event was started in 2013 and is organized by the Nagaland Anime Junkies. The cosfest is one of the biggest cosplay festivals in North East India.

Hornbill Festival

The Hornbill Festival is the biggest annual festival in North East India. The festival is held every year from 1 to 10 December with the purpose to promote the richness of the Naga heritage and traditions.

Fashion
The inhabitants of Kohima have been historically characterized as "fashion-conscious". Numerous fashion stores are located across the city and a number of fashion related events are held annually. The southern wards starting from Main Town and beyond are the most fashionable areas of Kohima.

Museums
The Nagaland State Museum is located in Bayavü Hill and displays a comprehensive collection of artefacts including ancient sculptures, traditional dresses, inscriptions of the Naga people.

Religious sites

The Mary Help of Christians Cathedral or commonly known as the Kohima Cathedral is a prominent landmark in Kohima. The 16 feet high carved wood crucifix is one of Asia's largest crosses. It is the biggest Catholic church in Nagaland and was constructed in 1998.

There are numerous Protestant churches in Kohima. Kohima Ao Baptist Church and Kohima Lotha Baptist Church are some of the biggest churches in Kohima.

The Kohima Jain Temple, the oldest 
Jain temple in North East India was established in 1920.

Media
The most widely circulated newspapers in Kohima are The Morung Express, Nagaland Post, Eastern Mirror, Nagaland Page and the local newspaper Capi. The city was also home to the now defunct Kewhira Dielie, the first modern newspaper published from Nagaland.

Kohima is home to several television networks: Nagaland Cornerstone TV, Doordarshan Kendra Kohima which operates the DD Nagaland, etc.

State-owned All India Radio has a local station in Kohima, which transmits various programs of mass interest like AIR FM Tragopan, etc.

Transportation
The major public transportation in Kohima are buses and taxis.

Airports
Kohima is served by the Dimapur Airport located in Chümoukedima–Dimapur,  from the city centre of Kohima. The currently under construction Kohima Chiethu Airport once completed will serve as the main airport for the Greater Kohima Metropolitan Area.

Roadways
Kohima is connected by road with NH 2 and NH 29 which pass through the city. The Dimapur–Kohima Expressway is a tolled expressway connecting Kohima with Dimapur.

Highways passing through Kohima
  Asian Highway 1: Tokyo  – Kohima  – Istanbul
  Asian Highway 2: Denpasar – Kohima  - Khosravi
 : Dibrugarh (Assam) – Kohima – Tuipang (Mizoram)
 : Dabaka (Assam) – Kohima – Jessami (Manipur)

Rail

Kohima is not connected with the rail network. The nearest railway stations are the Chümoukedima Shokhuvi Railway Station and the Dimapur Railway Station. An extension of the railway line from Dimapur to Kohima was proposed and surveyed in 2009. Due to a dispute over land acquisition the track was resurveyed and an alternative alignment was proposed in 2013 and is expected to be completed by 2026. Once completed the Kohima Zubza Railway Station on the Dhansiri–Zubza Line will serve as the main railway station of Kohima.

Cycling
Regardless of its hilly terrain, cycling has become an increasingly popular way to get in and around Kohima. A bicycle-sharing system was launched in September 2020.

Education

Kohima is home to some of the most prestigious educational institutions in Nagaland.

Universities and Colleges
 Nagaland Institute of Medical Science and Research
 Model Christian College
 Alder College
 Baptist College
Capital College of Higher Education
 Kohima College
 Mount Olive College
 Oriental College
 Kros College
 Modern College
 Kohima Law College

The following are major Universities and Colleges located in the Greater Kohima Metropolitan Area:
 St. Joseph's College, Jakhama
 Kohima Science College, Jotsoma
 Sazolie College, Jotsoma
 Japfü Christian College, Kigwema
 Nagaland University, Meriema Campus

Notable secondary schools
Ministers' Hill Baptist Higher Secondary School
Little Flower Higher Secondary School
Mezhür Higher Secondary School
Rüzhükhrie Government Higher Secondary School
Fernwood School
G. Rio School
Dainty Buds School
Vineyard School
Northfield School
Coraggio School
Stella Higher Secondary School
Chandmari Higher Secondary School
Mount Sinai Higher Secondary School
Bethel Higher Secondary School

Sports
Indira Gandhi Stadium, inaugurated in 2003 is the multipurpose stadium of the city. It includes a running track and a football field.

Football
Kohima is home to Kohima Komets, an association football club that plays in the top division Nagaland Premier League.

Wrestling
The Naga wrestling enjoys widespread popularity in Kohima with people from all over Nagaland coming to witness the Naga Wrestling Championship held every two years at the Khuochiezhie Local Ground located in the heart of Kohima. The first Naga Wrestling Tournament was held in Kohima in 1971.

Notable people

See also

 Outline of Kohima
 Municipal Wards of Kohima
 Index of Kohima-related articles

References

Further reading
  From Google Books.

External links

Official sites
Official website
Kohima Smart City (Official website)

 
Cities and towns in Kohima district
Hill stations in Nagaland
Populated places established in 1878
1878 establishments
Indian capital cities
Tourism in Northeast India